Fellows of the Royal Society elected in 2003.

Fellows 

John David Barrow
Susan Jocelyn Bell Burnell
Mariann Bienz
William Bonfield
John Milton Brown
Mark Wayne Chase
John Michael David Coey
Kay Elizabeth Davies
Anthony Dickinson
Eleanor Joy Dodson
Peter John Dornan
Ann Patricia Dowling
Jeffery Errington
Roger Fletcher
Roderick John Flower
Melvyn Francis Greaves
Peter James Green
Keith Gull
Peter William Harold Holland
James Hough
Malcolm Irving
Jonathan Dallas George Jones
Michael Lawrence Klein
Alan Graham MacDiarmid
Stephen Mann
Richard John Nelmes
Stephen Patrick O’Rahilly
Bridget Margaret Ogilvie
Timothy Noel Palmer
John C B Papaloizou
Venkatraman Ramakrishnan
Elizabeth Jane Robertson
John Gair Robson
John Donald Scott
Richard H. Sibson
Leon Melvyn Simon
Geoffrey Lilley Smith
Adrian Peter Sutton
Karen Heather Vousden
Andrew James Watson
Fiona Mary Watt
Peter Neil Temple Wells

Foreign members

Denis Baylor
Fotis Constantine Kafatos
Klaus von Klitzing
Donald Ervin Knuth
José Sarukhán
Valentine Louis Telegdi

References

2003
2003 in science
2003 in the United Kingdom